The stone sculpin (Paracottus knerii) is a species of cottoid fish endemic to Russia, where it is found in Lake Baikal and surrounding tributaries as well as the Gramninskie Lakes, Lake Verkhnaya Agata and the Enisei River and various lakes in Tuva. This species is the only recognized member of its genus.

It is often eaten by the Baikal seal, especially in the autumn.

Taxonomy
The stone sculpin was first formally described as Cottus knerii in 1874 by the Polish zoologist Benedykt Dybowski with its type locality given as Lake Baikal and the Angara, Irkut and  Selenga rivers in Siberia. In 1949 Dmitrii Nikolaevich Taliev classified the stone sculpin in the monospecific genus Porocottus. The genus was classified in the family Cottocomephoridae, however, the 5th edition of Fishes of the World classifies the genus within the subfamily Cottinae of the family Cottidae, studies having found that the genera formerly included in the Cottocomephoridae were a clade arising from the genus Cottus.

Appearance
Its colour varies from olive to brown or grey, and it has several dark spots and bands.

Habitat
The stone sculpin is most common in the southern part of Lake Baikal and prefers areas with a stony bottom, but may also occur over sand.

Behavior
The female lays 200–700 eggs in a crevice under a stone, which are guarded by the male and hatch after about one month. This sculpin feeds on small animals such as copepods and amphipods.

References

Cottinae
Monotypic fish genera
Fish of Lake Baikal
Fish described in 1874